Quesnelia lateralis is a species of bromeliad in the genus Quesnelia.

This species is endemic to the Atlantic Forest ecoregion of southeastern Brazil.

Gallery

References

lateralis
Endemic flora of Brazil
Flora of the Atlantic Forest
Flora of Espírito Santo
Flora of Minas Gerais